Effe was a monthly feminist Italian magazine which was published between 1973 and 1982. It was similar to Ms. Magazine. Effe was headquartered in Rome.

History and profile
Effe was established in 1973. The magazine inspired from the views of American feminist Shulamith Firestone. Daniela Colombo was one of the founders and editors-in-chief of the magazine, which was published on a monthly basis. The other founder was Alma Sabatini. The first editor of Effe was Gabriella Parca. In the 1970s Adele Cambria was among the editors of the magazine, which extensively dealt with the topics of love and affective relationships between couples. For the contributors of the magazine love was an abstract notion as well as a fact of daily life, both heterosexual and homosexual. Effe frequently attacked mainstream women's magazines in Italy.

Effe ceased publication in 1982.

References

1973 establishments in Italy
1982 disestablishments in Italy
Defunct political magazines published in Italy
Feminism in Italy
Feminist magazines
Magazines established in 1973
Magazines disestablished in 1982
Magazines published in Rome
Monthly magazines published in Italy
Women's magazines published in Italy